The following is a list of the 279 communes of the French department of Haute-Savoie.

The communes cooperate in the following intercommunalities (as of 2020):
Annemasse - Les Voirons Agglomération
Communauté d'agglomération du Grand Annecy
CA Thonon Agglomération
Communauté de communes Arve et Salève
Communauté de communes Cluses-Arve et Montagnes
Communauté de communes Faucigny-Glières
Communauté de communes Fier et Usses
Communauté de communes du Genevois
Communauté de communes du Haut-Chablais
Communauté de communes des Montagnes du Giffre
Communauté de communes du Pays de Cruseilles
Communauté de communes Pays d'Évian Vallée d'Abondance
Communauté de communes Pays du Mont-Blanc
Communauté de communes du Pays Rochois
Communauté de communes des Quatre Rivières
Communauté de communes Rumilly Terre de Savoie
Communauté de communes des Sources du Lac d'Annecy
Communauté de communes Usses et Rhône (partly)
Communauté de communes de la Vallée de Chamonix-Mont-Blanc
Communauté de communes de la Vallée Verte
Communauté de communes des Vallées de Thônes

References

Haute-Savoie